Eustrophopsis is a genus of polypore fungus beetles in the family Tetratomidae. There are about seven described species in Eustrophopsis.

Species
These seven species belong to the genus Eustrophopsis:
 Eustrophopsis arizonensis (Horn, 1888)
 Eustrophopsis bicolor (Fabricius, 1798)
 Eustrophopsis brunneimarginatus (Dury, 1906)
 Eustrophopsis confinis (LeConte, 1866)
 Eustrophopsis crowdyi Pollock, 2012
 Eustrophopsis indistinctus (LeConte, 1851)
 Eustrophopsis ornatus (VanDyke, 1928)

References

Further reading

External links

 

Tenebrionoidea
Articles created by Qbugbot